The Secret Garden is a 1975 British television adaptation of Frances Hodgson Burnett's 1911 novel of the same name. Adapted, produced and directed by Dorothea Brooking, it was first broadcast on BBC 1 in seven 30-minute episodes. This is the only BBC adaptation of the novel known to exist in its entirety. The 1952 adaptation is missing all eight episodes and the 1960 adaptation is missing three of its eight episodes.

Plot 
The series begins with Mary Lennox (played by Sarah Hollis Andrews) being abandoned by residents of a house, due to fears of cholera, and found by some soldiers. She is sent to her uncle's residence, Misselthwaite Manor. She befriends his maids and meets a boy named Dickon. One night she hears crying, and leaves her room to investigate; thereby she meets Colin, her cousin. Colin is bedridden and thinks he is a hunchback, but learns this is not true. He begins to go outside, spending time with Dickon and Mary in the gardens. Mary finds a key and finds a hidden door as well, and learns that behind the wall is a secret garden that her uncle's wife had worked on every day until she died, so he hid the key and the door. Colin learns to walk; Mary's uncle learns of this, and the series ends with her uncle and Colin walking with each other.

Episode list

Theme music
The soundtrack features a solo oboe playing "The Watermill" by Ronald Binge.

Reception
The drama was nominated for a British Academy Television Award in 1976 in the drama/entertainment category, and in 1979 it was nominated in the children's entertainment series category at the 1979 Daytime Emmy Awards.

References

External links
 
 
 

1970s British children's television series
1975 British television series debuts
1975 British television series endings
BBC television dramas
BBC children's television shows
Films based on The Secret Garden
Television series about orphans